This is a list of Italian television related events from 1982.

Events
11 July - Italy beat West Germany 3-1 to win the 1982 World Cup at Madrid, Spain.

Debuts

Rai 

 Che fai, ridi? (What are you doing? Are you laughing?) – cycle of mockumentaries or documentaries in a humorous key about the Italian comic actors, from Monica Vitti to Diego Abatantuono, sometimes works by famous directors as Carlo Vanzina or Pupi Avati.

Serials 

La pietra di Marco Polo (Marco Polo’s stone) – by Aldo Lado; for children. Five Venetian kids make up a gang, searing allegiance upon the stone of the title.
Pimpa – cartoon, by Francesco Tullio Altan.

Private channels 

 Maurizio Costanzo show (Rete 4, later Canale 5) – talks show hosted by Maurzio Costanzo, again on air (with a break-up from 2009 to 2015). The most long-living, popular and controversial Italian talk show, during the years sometimes has faced social questions with commendable commitment, more often has given in to sensationalism and trash.

International
22 September -  Voltron (Canale 5) (1984-1985)
 Marine Boy (1969-1971)

Television shows

Rai

Miniseries 

 Panagulis vive (1981) (Panagoullis lives) – biopic by Giuseppe Ferrara, with Stathis Giallelis; 4 episodes.
 Storia d’amore e d’amicizia (Love and friendship story) – by Franco Rossi, with Claudio Amendola (introducing), Massimo Bonetti and Barbara De Rossi; 6 episodes. In the Thirties, two young boxers, a Jew and an antifascist, are friend and love rivals; both will be victims of the fascism and of the war.

Period dramas 
RAI answers to the spread of American fictions on the private networks with three miniseries of prestige, realized in international coproduction and trusted to renowned movie directors.
La certosa di Parma (The charterhouse of Parma) – by Mauro Bolognini, from the Stendahl’s novel, with Andrea Occhipinti, Marthe Keller and Gian Maria Volontè; in 6 episodes.
Marco Polo – by Giuliano Montaldo, with Ken Marshall in the title role, Denhom Elliott and Burt Lancaster as Pope Gregory X; 8 episodes. It’s one of the most sumptuous RAI serials, realized in collaboration with NBC and the Chinese TV, that, for the first time, takes part to a Western production; the productive effort is repaid by an extraordinary public success in Italy and abroad. The serial is broadcast in 47 countries and wins three Emmy Awards.
The life of Verdi – by Renato Castellani; with Ronald Pickup in the title role and Carla Fracci as Giuseppina Strepponi; 9 episodes. The serial is appreciated for the accurate historical reconstruction but criticized for the miscasting of the protagonist.

Serials 

 L’indizio- 5 inchieste per un commissario (The clue – Five enquiries for a superintendent) – by Andrea Camilleri, with Lino Troisi, as a Neapolitan police superintendent in service in Turin, and Ida Di Benedetto.

Variety 

 Attore, amore mio (Actor, my love) – Gigi Proietti’s one-man show, directed by Antonello Falqui.

Births

Deaths

See also
List of Italian films of 1982

References